Curtis Van Hughes (born November 14, 1960) is a former American professional football player who played defensive tackle and defensive end for two seasons with the St. Louis Cardinals and Seattle Seahawks of the National Football League (NFL).

Early life
Hughes was born in Waco, Texas. He played high school football at Axtell High School as a fullback and gained 1,700 yards.

Professional career
Hughes was drafted by the Pittsburgh Steelers in the fifth round of the 1984 NFL draft. He played eight career NFL games – seven with the 1986 St. Louis Cardinals and one with the 1987 Seattle Seahawks.

References

 

Players of American football from Texas
Living people
1960 births
People from Waco, Texas
Seattle Seahawks players
St. Louis Cardinals (football) players
National Football League replacement players